Luvanmusiq (Lovin' Musiq) is the fourth release by the singer-songwriter Musiq Soulchild, the first under his contract with Atlantic Records. The lead single, "B.U.D.D.Y.", was released to U.S. radio in late November 2006; it reached number two on the R&B chart, and number 36 on the Billboard Hot 100. Following its release, it entered the U.S. Billboard 200 at number 1, with 149,774 copies sold. During the same week, the second single, "Teachme", entered the U.S. Hot R&B/Hip-Hop Songs chart at number 54, and rose to number five in its thirteenth week. "Teachme" also entered the Hot 100 at number 92 on the issue date, May 26, 2007. By July 11, 2007, the album had sold 789,377 copies in the U.S.

The third single from the album was "Makeyouhappy", first said in an entry on Soulchild's MySpace blog. The song entered the Hot R&B/Hip-hop Songs chart, peaking at number 61. The album was nominated for Best R&B Album at the 50th Grammy Awards.

Critical reception

Luvanmusiq received positive reviews from music critics. AllMusic editor Andy Kellman gave note of the record's short running time allowing equal attention for each track and the overall throwback aesthetic being the same as Musiq's previous efforts and not containing "insincere trend-hopping or ill-fitting collaborations with hot MCs." He concluded that "[T]hey're neither raunchy nor drab, and they're nearly a lost art form in 2007." DJBooth's Nathan Slavik gave praise to the musicianship feeling mature throughout the record's track list of slow jams and crowd pleasers, despite the former's combination of lush minimalism and sincere lyricism coming across as "background music." He concluded that, "If Musiq’s sole intention for this album was to remind us he’s alive, mission accomplished. Luvanmusiq has several solid tracks, and a couple excellent ones, but as a whole it falls just short of excellent." Mark Edward Nero from About.com gave a mixed review of the album, commending Musiq for remaining consistent in terms of his "soft, deliberate vocal style" and penchant for romantic ballads but felt that it comes across as though he's shown "little creative growth as a singer." He highlighted the tracks "Betterman", "Makeyouhappy" and "Ridiculous" for having enough content to stand alongside the first single "B.U.D.D.Y." and showcasing Musiq's continued talent as "one of the better R&B songwriters in the business today", concluding that "Although Luvanmusiq rates pretty low in the excitement and thrills departments, if you take the time to listen to it repeatedly, it's an album whose subtle romantic charm grows on you."

Track listing

Bonus tracks
 "Ooo Baby Baby" (3:02) (Circuit City bonus track)
 "Movin' On" (4:11) (AOL Black Voices exclusive track)
 "Allaboutyou" (2:52) (Best Buy bonus track)
 "Ridethrough" (3:06) (Best Buy bonus track)
 "Slowdown" (3:50) (Best Buy bonus track)
 "Rewind" (3:08) (iTunes bonus track)

Samples
 "B.U.D.D.Y." contains interpolations from the Taana Gardner song "Heartbeat".
 "Lullaby" contains elements from the Blue Magic song "Stop to Start".
 "Ms.Philadelphia"  contains elements from "Overjoyed" by Stevie Wonder.

Personnel

 Ivan "Orthodox" Barias – Composer, engineer, Executive Producer, producer, Tracking, Vocal Producer
 Adam Blackstone – Bass
 Randy Bowland – Guitar
 Bruce Buechner – Engineer
 Greg Gigendad Burke – Art Direction
 Sandra Campbell – Project Coordinator
 Warryn Campbell – Composer, Instrumentation, Keyboards, Piano, producer, Vocal Producer, Vocals (Background)
 Sean Cooper – Sound Design
 Eric Dawkins – Vocals, Vocals (Background)
 Tony Dixon – Vocal Producer
 Cara Donatto – Publicity
 Theron "Neff U" Feemster – Bass, Drums, Instrumentation, Keyboards, producer
 Allan Felder – Composer
 Miguel Gandelman – Horn
 Chris Gehringer – Mastering
 Serban Ghenea – Mixing
 Marc Gordon – Composer
 James Grant – Composer
 Victor Jason Greig – Executive Producer
 Earl Guinn – Composer
 Carvin "Ransum" Haggins – Composer, engineer, Executive Producer, producer, Tracking, Vocal Producer
 John Hanes – Digital Editing
 Ayana Hipps – Vocals (Background)
 Jerome Hipps – Executive Producer
 Jake & the Phatman – Producer
 Lab Ratz – Instrumentation, producer
 Kevin Liles – Executive Producer, Executive Vice President
 Harold Lilly – Composer, producer, Vocal Producer, Vocals (Background)

 Riley Mackin – Assistant Engineer
 Harvey Mason, Jr. – Composer
 Michael McArthur – Executive Producer
 George "Spanky" McCurdy – Drums
 Wesley Morrow – Production Coordination
 Musiq Soulchild – Arranger, composer, Executive Producer, Keyboards, Primary Artist, producer, Rhythm, Vocal Producer, Vocals, Vocals (Background)
 Ne-Yo – Vocal Producer
 Kenton Nix – Composer
 Benjamin O'Neil "Benanas" – Guitar
 Robert Ozuna – Composer, Drums, Percussion, Scratching
 Joi L. Pitts – Product Manager
 Aaron Renner – Engineer
 Tim Roberts – Assistant
 Nick Romei – Packaging Manager
 Raphael Saadiq – Bass, composer, Guitar, Keyboards, producer
 Shaffer Smith – Composer
 Glenn Standridge – Engineer
 Frank Sutton – Engineer, Tracking
 John Tanksley – Production Coordination
 James Tanskley – Assistant Engineer
 Damon Thomas – Composer
 The Underdogs – Instrumentation, producer
 Ben Watts – Photography
 Corey Williams – Composer
 Curtis "Sauce" Wilson – Arranger, composer, Drums, Keyboards, producer, Programming, Rhythm
 Dontae Winslow – Horn
 Kelvin Wooten – Keyboards
 Yuan – Design
 Andrew Zaeh – Art Producer

Charts and certifications

Weekly charts

Certifications

Year-end charts

References

2007 albums
Musiq Soulchild albums
Albums produced by Raphael Saadiq
Albums produced by Theron Feemster
Albums produced by the Underdogs (production team)
Albums produced by Warryn Campbell
Atlantic Records albums